"Un Monde parfait" ("A Perfect World" in English) is a 2005 song recorded by French young artist Ilona Mitrecey. Based on a traditional Neapolitan song, it was the first single from her debut album Un Monde parfait and was released in February 2005. It was immediately a very big hit in France and Belgium (Wallonia), where it remained for several months atop of the chart, thus becoming one of the biggest-selling singles there. It was also released in many other European countries and achieved success, in Switzerland, Austria, Portugal and Germany where it was a top three hit. It was the best-selling single of the 21st century in France, with 1.5 million copies sold. Ilona was only 10 years old when she sang the song.

Background and writing
In 2004, one year after its recording in France, the single had already been released in Italy, under the name 'Très Bien featuring Ilona'. Originally, it was intended for the Italian dancefloors.

During an interview, Ilona explained that, before "Un Monde parfait", she sang just for fun with her friends. She confided that she recorded "Un Monde parfait" completely by chance and she did that only for play. Her father's society had asked whether she could sing this song from Italy. As she had already sung for some advertisements, she accepted, saying to herself that it could be funny to try.

Music and video

The French charts specialist Elia Habib explains that this song "mixes an involving sonority resembling Daddy DJ with a text in the spirit of a nursery rhyme". It created "the major surprise of the beginning of spring 2005".

The music video is computer-animated and shows a little girl who will feature in all the other videoclips of the singles from the album Un Monde parfait. Ilona features only in the first seconds. She explained that the producers had decided to make most of the video a cartoon because it tallied well with the lyrics and that would preserve her anonymity.

Ilona says in this song that when she starts to draw, she imagines a perfect world populated of technicolor flowers and animals. Six of these animals also appear in Ilona's all other music videos and on every cover of the singles from Un Monde parfait.

Chart performances
In France, the single went immediately to number two on 27 February 2005 and was number one the following week, and kept this position for 15 weeks. It remained on the top ten for 28 weeks and on the top 100 for 41 weeks, so it was the longest single running in the French singles chart in 2005. It was the best selling single that year and was certified Diamond disc by Syndicat National de l'Édition Phonographique.  According to author and expert of French charts Elia Habib, Ilona, who was 11 years old in 2005, remains "the first native of the Nineties to reach number one of the [French Singles Chart]. Through her age, she now appears in Record books, [because she is] the second youngest artist to peak at the top position, behind Jordy (four years old)". "Un Monde parfait" was cited as the most lucrative song of 2006 at the time of a conference given by the SACEM. The song eventually became the best best-selling single of the 21st century in France, with 1,500,000 units sold.

In Belgium (Wallonia), the single remained on the Ultratop 40 Singles Chart from 2 April to 5 November 2005 (32 weeks), and peaked at number one for twelve weeks. It was certified Silver disc and was the second best selling single in 2005, only beaten by Crazy Frog's "Axel F". On the Swiss Singles Chart, the single went to number 16 on 3 April 2005 and reached a peak at number three on 1 May 2005. It fell off the chart after 34 weeks, on 11 November 2005. "Un monde parfait" also appeared on Austrian Top 75 Singles Chart from 26 June 2005 to 18 November 2005 (22 weeks) and reached number three for two weeks.

One year later, the single made a short appearance (2 weeks) on Dutch Mega Top 100, where it peaked at number 92, on 8 July 2006.

TV performances and cover versions
Ilona very rarely did live performances, but she was coaxed into appearing on the nationally acclaimed show Hit Machine on M6, on 7 May 2005. That performance, carried out with choreography, may have sparked her subsequent success with her single "Un Monde parfait".

Le 6/9, a French team, recorded a parody of this song, under the title "Un Casting parfait". This version peaked at number six on the French SNEP Singles Chart and at number 78 in Switzerland.

The song was covered by Les Enfoirés on their album 2011: Dans l'œil des Enfoirés, and included in the medley "Un monde Parfait". The song was performed by Alizée & Claire Keim, with additional vocals from Grégoire, Christophe Maé & Pascal Obispo.

Formats and track listings

 CD single - France

 CD maxi Universal

 CD maxi 1 Atollo / Universal

 CD maxi 2 Atollo / Universal

 12" maxi

 Digital download

Credits and personnel

 Original version
 Written by Laurent Jeanne, M. Pirolla, Domydee, R. Castagnola
 Executive producer : Ivan Russo
 Assistant producer : Ivan Russo and Rosario Castagnola
 Produced at Studio Moneypenny (Paris)
 Vocal : Ilona
 Choir : Laurent Jeanne
 Guitars and bass : Rosario Castagnola
 Fisa : Antonio Russo
 Arrangements : Ivan Russo, Domydee and Rosario Castagnola, at Studio Atollo Recordes
 Mixed by Ivan Russo at Studio Atollo Recording (Neaple)
 Whistler remix / Party remix / Extended mix / Blade remix
 Remix and additional production by Glasperlen-spierlern (Robert Wässer, Daniel Scholz and Kay Wittgenstein

 72 fest & forios radio edit
 Remix and additional production by P. Aliberti, Cipro and C. Piccinelli for 72trax Productions
 Original editors : Universal Music Italia Srl / Atollo / Moneypenny
 Cover and design
 Photo : Stéphane Gizard
 Artwork : Objectif Lune
 Design elements and graphique : Studio Nestor for Costume3pièces, Courtesy for Scorpio Music
 Videoclip
 Produced by Stéphane Mit

Charts

Weekly charts

Year-end charts

Certifications and sales

References

2005 debut singles
Ilona Mitrecey songs
Ultratop 50 Singles (Wallonia) number-one singles
SNEP Top Singles number-one singles
2005 songs